Chubby and the Gang are an English rock band formed in West London in 2019. Consisting of vocalist Charlie "Chubby Charles" Manning-Walker, guitarists Ethan Stahl and Tom "Razor" Hardwick, bassist Maegan Brooks Mills and drummer Joe McMahon, the band was formed out of a number of UK hardcore punk bands, including Arms Race, Vile Spirit and Gutter Knife.

History
Charlie "Chubby" Manning-Walker first became involved in bands in the British hardcore punk scene in 2004, when he was 15 years old. By the 2010s, he was primarily involved in New Wave of British Hardcore bands, as a member of Violent Reaction and Arms Race. It was here that he met the members of Brighton bands Vile Spirit and Gutter Knife, with whom he would eventually form Chubby and the Gang.

In 2019, they entered the studio to record their debut album Speed Kills, with producer Jonah Falco of Fucked Up. In January 2020, the band toured the United States twice supporting the Royal Hounds, followed by Hank Wood and the Hammerheads, during which Speed Kills was released through Static Shock Records, although it was intended to be released prior to the tours. In March 2020, it was announced that they would play the 2021 Two Thousand Trees Festival. Later that year, Austin was replaced by Maegan Brooks. Soon after, they entered the studio again to record their upcoming follow-up album. The band's recorded process this time around was more thought-out, spending ten days in the studio. On 8 October 2020, they premiered their track "Union Dues" as a single, and released a music video for the Speed Kills track "All Along the Uxbridge Road". On 10 October, they announced their debut headline performance would be at Bush Hall, London, on 15 May 2021. On 19 November, it was announced that they would play the 2021 Great Escape Festival. On 20 November, Speed Kills was re-released through Partisan Records. On 14 April 2021, they released the single "Lightning Don't Strike Twice", which was followed by "Life's Lemons" on May 28. On 15 June, it was announced that both tracks would be included on the band's second album the Mutt's Nuts, which was released in 21 August 2021, and released the single "Coming Up Tough". Between 29 February and 5 March 2022, the band opened for Turnstile on their UK headline tour. On 14 February 2022, they released the three track EP Labour of Love.

Musical style
The band has been described as punk rock, rock and roll and pub rock. Their music incorporates elements of surf rock, classic pop, hardcore punk, doo wop, blues, oi!, power pop, street punk and glam rock. Their songs generally include high tempos and the use of hooks. A number of the band's songs express the members' leftist political views, including trade unionism, police brutality and working-class pride.

In an article for Rolling Stone, their debut album Speed Kills was described as "all buzzsaw riffs and drums that barrel forward like an 18-wheeler twisting around a cliff-edge switchback at top speed. But the tension between mayhem and heart, fury and fun, is always there". Vice writer Jak Hutchcraft described it as having "the punk rock earworms of Rudi, the footy terrace chants of Blitz, the garage spirit of Royal Headache and the honest pub rock of Coloured Balls." The Guardian writer described it as taking "the evolution of punk – a pinch of pub rock, its anarchic 1977 heyday, a dose of 100mph hardcore – and fuses it all together to create something a bit like what the immortal Ramones might have sounded like if they’d hung out on west London’s Uxbridge Road and not CBGB in New York City". Clash magazine described their style as "built on a world-class rhythm section that’s forever moments from collapse." Stereogum cited their debut album's title track as "a sloppy drunk goof, an intensely fast stumbling ripper that has fun with itself as it rocks out."

They have cited influences including the Ramones, Dr. Feelgood, Coloured Balls and Iron Virgin. In reference to the band's choice of sound, Manning-Walker stated "I wanted to put in an organ, a handclap, a harmonica, a tambourine and the quick element of it comes from me only experiencing hardcore for 15 years. Because of where I come from it all ended up being 200mph." Their music also often makes use of vocal samples from television series and movies such as the Jimmie Rodgers Show.

Members
Current
Charlie "Chubby Charles" Manning-Walker – lead vocals, harmonica (2019–present)
Ethan Stahl – guitar (2019–present)
Tom "Razor" Hardwick – guitar (2019–present)
Joe McMahon – drums (2019–present)
Maegan Brooks Mills – bass (2020–present)

Former
Luke Austin – bass (2019–2020)

Discography

Studio albums
Speed Kills (2020)
The Mutt's Nuts (2021)

EPs
Labour of Love (2022)

Singles
"Union Dues" (2020)
"Lightning Don't Strike Twice" (2021)
"Life's Lemons" (2021)
"Coming Up Tough" (2021)

Music videos

References

English punk rock groups
British rock and roll music groups
Musical groups from London
Musical groups established in 2019
British pub rock music groups
Underground punk scene in the United Kingdom
2019 establishments in England